Valloniidae is a taxonomic family of small and minute, air-breathing land snails, terrestrial pulmonate gastropod mollusks in the superfamily Pupilloidea.

Anatomy
In this family, the number of haploid chromosomes lies between 26 and 30 (according to the values in this table).

Taxonomy 
The family Valloniidae has no subfamilies (according to the taxonomy of the Gastropoda by Bouchet & Rocroi, 2005).

Genera 
Genera within the family Valloniidae include:
 † Acanthopupa Wenz in Fischer & Wenz, 1914 
 † Esuinella Harzhauser, Neubauer & Georgopoulou in Harzhauser et al., 2014 
 † Nanxiongospira Yü, 1977 
 † Sexlamellospira Wang, 1982 
 † Shanghuspira Yü, 1977 
Subfamily Acanthinulinae Steenberg, 1917
 Acanthinula Beck, 1847
 Pupisoma Stoliczka, 1873
 Salpingoma F. Haas, 1937
 Spermodea Westerlund, 1902
 Zoogenetes Morse, 1864
 Subfamily Valloniinae Morse, 1864
 Gittenbergia Giusti, Castagnoli & Manganelli, 1985
 Plagyrona E. Gittenberger, 1977
 Planogyra Morse, 1864
 Vallonia Risso, 1826 - the type genus of the family Valloniidae

References

External links